Indy R Rahmawati (born April 1, 1971) is an Indonesian news anchor and  producer in TvOne. She was born in Bandung and began her television career in 1999. Rahmawati started her career as a journalist with SCTV in 1999 to 2006 before moving to antv in 2006 to 2008, andcontinued her career as a presenter with TvOne in 2008 to present.

References

1971 births
Indonesian journalists
Indonesian women journalists
Indonesian television presenters
Indonesian women television presenters
Living people